Eugene William Pallette (July 8, 1889 – September 3, 1954) was an American actor who worked in both the silent and sound eras, performing in more than 240 productions between 1913 and 1946. 

After an early career as a slender leading man, Pallette became a stout character actor. He had a deep voice, which some critics have likened to the sound of a croaking frog, and is probably best-remembered for comic character roles such as Alexander Bullock (Carole Lombard's character's father) in My Man Godfrey (1936), Friar Tuck in The Adventures of Robin Hood (1938), and his similar role as Fray Felipe in The Mark of Zorro (1940). He also co-starred in Mr. Smith Goes to Washington (1939) and Heaven Can Wait (1943).

Early life 

He was born in Winfield, Kansas, the son of William Baird Pallette and Elnora "Ella" Jackson. His parents had been actors in their younger years, but by 1889 Pallette's father was an insurance salesman. His sister was Beulah L. Pallette.

Pallette attended Culver Military Academy in Culver, Indiana. He also worked as a jockey, and did a stage act which included three horses.

Career 
Pallette began his acting career on the stage in stock company roles, appearing for a period of six years.

Silent films 
Pallette began his silent film career as an extra and stunt man in 1910 or 1911. His first credited appearance was in the one-reel short western/drama The Fugitive (1913) which was directed by Wallace Reid for Flying "A" Studios at Santa Barbara. The up-and-coming actor was also splitting an apartment with actor Wallace Reid.

 
Quickly advancing to featured status, Pallette was cast in many westerns. He worked with D. W. Griffith on such films as The Birth of a Nation (1915), where he played two parts, one in blackface, and Intolerance (1916). He also played a Chinese role in Tod Browning's The Highbinders. At this time, Pallette had a slim, athletic figure, a far cry from his portly build later in his career. He starred as the slender sword-fighting swashbuckler Aramis in Douglas Fairbanks' 1921 version of The Three Musketeers, one of the great smash hits of the silent era. However, his girth had begun to get stockier, ending his ambitions of becoming a leading man. Discouraged, Pallette left Hollywood for the oil fields of Texas, where he both made and lost a sizable fortune of $140,000 in the same year. Eventually he returned to film work.

After gaining a great deal of weight, he became one of the screen's most recognizable character actors. In 1927, he signed as a regular for Hal Roach Studios and was a reliable comic foil in several early Laurel and Hardy movies. In later years, Pallette's weight may have topped out at more than 300 pounds (136 kg).

Sound films 

The advent of the talkies proved to be the second major career boost for Pallette. In 1929 he appeared as "Honey" Wiggin in the 1929 talkie The Virginian. His inimitable rasping gravel voice (described as "half an octave below anyone else in the cast") made him one of Hollywood's most sought-after character actors in the 1930s and 1940s.

The typical Pallette role was gruff, aggravated and down to earth. He played the comically exasperated head of the family (e.g., My Man Godfrey, The Lady Eve, Heaven Can Wait), the cynical backroom sharpy (Mr. Smith Goes to Washington), and the gruff police sergeant in five Philo Vance films including The Kennel Murder Case. Pallette thus appeared in more Philo Vance films than any of the ten actors who played the aristocratic lead role of Vance. Pallette's best-known role may be as Friar Tuck in The Adventures of Robin Hood; he made a similar appearance as Friar Felipe two years later in The Mark of Zorro.

BBC commentator Dana Gioia described Pallette's onscreen appeal: The mature Pallette character is a creature of provocative contradictions—tough-minded but indulgent, earthy but epicurean, relaxed but excitable. His grit and gravel voice sounds simultaneously tough and comic. ... Pallette uses his girth to create a common touch. Stuffed into a tuxedo that seems perpetually near bursting, he seems more down-to-earth than the stylish high society types who surround him.

Pallette was cast as the father of lead actress Jeanne Crain for the film In the Meantime, Darling (1944). Director Otto Preminger clashed with Pallette and claimed he was "an admirer of Hitler and convinced that Germany would win the war". Pallette refused to sit at the same table with black actor Clarence Muse in a scene set in a kitchen. "You're out of your mind, I won't sit next to a nigger", Pallette hissed at Preminger. Preminger furiously informed Fox studio head Darryl F. Zanuck, who fired Pallette. Although Pallette remains in scenes he already had filmed, the remainder of his role not yet shot was eliminated from the script. However, a 1953 issue of the African-American magazine Jet listed Pallette as being among the attendees of a Hollywood banquet honoring the then "oldest Negro actress in the world," Madame Sul-Te-Wan. For his part, Pallette always maintained that a medical problem with his throat ended his career.

In increasingly ill health by his late fifties, Pallette made fewer and fewer movies, and for lesser studios. His final movie, Suspense, was released in 1946.

Later life

In 1946, convinced that there was going to be a "world blow-up" by atomic bombs, the hawkish Pallette received considerable publicity when he set up a "mountain fortress" on a  ranch near Imnaha, Oregon, as a hideaway from universal catastrophe. The "fortress" reportedly was stocked with a sizable herd of prize cattle, enormous supplies of food, and had its own canning plant and lumber mill.

When the "blow-up" he anticipated failed to materialize after two years, he began disposing of the Oregon ranch and returned to Los Angeles and his movie colony friends. He never appeared in another movie, however. 

Eugene Pallette died at age 65 in 1954 from throat cancer at his apartment, 10835 Wilshire Boulevard, in Los Angeles. His wife, Marjorie, and his sister, Beulah Phelps, were at his side. Private funeral services were conducted on Saturday, September 4, 1954, at the Armstrong Family Mortuary. His cremated remains are interred in an unmarked grave behind the monument of his parents at Green Lawn Cemetery in Grenola, Kansas. 

He has a star on the Hollywood Walk of Fame at 6702 Hollywood Boulevard for his contribution to motion pictures.

Filmography

References

Works cited

Further reading

External links

Obituary
Literature on Eugene Pallette

1889 births
1954 deaths
20th-century American male actors
American male film actors
American male silent film actors
American male stage actors
Articles containing video clips
Culver Academies alumni
Deaths from cancer in California
Male actors from Kansas
Paramount Pictures contract players
People from Winfield, Kansas
Survivalists